The following is a list of some notable current and former faculty of New York Institute of Technology.

Reino Aarnio, architect
Rebecca Allen, artist 
Ernie Anastos, won 28 Emmy Awards and nominations, and was nominated for the Edward R. Murrow Award for excellence in writing
Jim Blinn, computer scientist known for his work as a computer graphics expert at NASA's Jet Propulsion Laboratory
Harvey Jerome Brudner, theoretical physicist/engineer
Carter Burwell, composer of film scores
Edwin Catmull, computer scientist and current president of Pixar Animation Studios and Walt Disney Animation Studios
James H. Clark, entrepreneur and computer scientist, founded companies, including Netscape Communications Corporation
 Evan Conti (born 1993), American-Israeli basketball player and coach 
Franklin C. Crow, computer scientist
David DiFrancesco, photoscientist, inventor, cinematographer, and photographer.
Tom Duff, computer programmer
Ed Emshwiller, visual artist 
Bernard Fryshman, physicist
Andrew Glassner, expert in computer graphics
William E. Glenn, inventor known for his contributions to imaging technology. He was awarded 136 U.S. patents.
Ralph Guggenheim, video graphics designer
Lance Williams, graphics researcher 
Alvy Ray Smith, pioneer in computer graphics
Greg Panos, writer, futurist, educator
Mehrdad Izady, contemporary writer on ethnic and cultural topics, particularly the Greater Middle East, and Kurds
Lynn Rogoff, film and television producer, and stage playwright, theatre director and professor 
Sheldon D. Fields, scientist
Frank Genese, architect
Pat Hanrahan, computer graphics researcher
Frederic Parke, creator of the first CG physically modeled human face
Barbara, Lady Judge, Chairman Emeritus of the UK Atomic Energy Authority
Jacques Stroweis, visual effects artist and computer scientist 
Bruce Perens, computer programmer and advocate in the free software movement
Harry Hurwitz, film director, screenwriter, actor and producer
Morrie Yohai, food company executive best known for his creation of Cheez Doodles
Joel B. Snyder, served as the Institute of Electrical and Electronics Engineers President
W. Kenneth Riland, osteopathic physician (D.O.) whose patients included 37th President of the United States Richard Nixon and Nelson A. Rockefeller
Manfred Kirchheimer, documentary film maker
John Lewis, computer scientist

References

New York Institute of Technology
New York Institute of Technology
New York Institute of Technology faculty